Flight 214 may refer to:
Pan Am Flight 214, a Boeing 707-121 that crashed in Maryland on 8 December 1963
Asiana Airlines Flight 214, a Boeing 777-200ER that crashed in San Francisco on 6 July 2013

0214